CJBC may refer to:

 CJBC (AM), a radio station (860 AM) licensed to Toronto, Ontario, Canada
 CJBC-FM, a radio station (90.3 FM) licensed to Toronto, Ontario, Canada